Mohammed Eidah Al-Saiari (born May 2, 1993) is a Saudi football player who plays as a forward for Al-Ittihad.

International
He was included in the 2019 AFC Asian Cup squad for Saudi Arabia national football team and made his debut for the squad on 31 December 2018 in a friendly against South Korea as a 61st-minute substitute for Fahad Al-Muwallad.

Career statistics

Club

Honours
Al-Faisaly
 King Cup: 2020–21

Al-Ittihad
Saudi Super Cup: 2022

References

External links 
 
 

1993 births
Living people
Saudi Arabian footballers
Saudi Arabia international footballers
Ittihad FC players
Hajer FC players
Ettifaq FC players
Al-Taawoun FC players
Al-Hazem F.C. players
Al-Wehda Club (Mecca) players
Al-Faisaly FC players
Saudi Professional League players
Association football forwards
2019 AFC Asian Cup players
Saudi Arabia youth international footballers